Events from the year 1630 in art.

Events
The gardens of Sentō Imperial Palace, Kyoto, are laid out by Kobori Masakazu.

Paintings

 Reza Abbasi - Two Lovers
 Pieter Claesz - Vanitas Still Life
 Claude Lorrain - Landscape with Merchants (The Shipwreck) (also etching)
 Georges de La Tour - The Fortune Teller
 Judith Leyster
 A Game of Tric Trac
 The Happy Couple
 Self-portrait
 Rembrandt - paintings using chiaroscuro
 Jeremiah Lamenting the Destruction of Jerusalem
 The Raising of Lazarus
 Anthony van Dyck - The Vision of the Blessed Hermann Joseph
 Diego Velázquez - Apollo in the Forge of Vulcan
 Francisco de Zurbarán - Death of Saint Bonaventura

Births
January 27 - Job Adriaenszoon Berckheyde, Dutch artist (died 1698)
April 16 - Lambert van Haven, Danish painter, architect and master builder (died 1695)
August 20 - Maria van Oosterwijck, Dutch painter, specializing in richly detailed still-lifes (died 1693)
September 27 - Michael Willmann, German painter (died 1706)
December 28 - Ludolf Bakhuysen, Dutch painter (died 1708)
date unknown
Caius Gabriel Cibber, Danish sculptor (died 1700)
Geronimo de Bobadilla, Spanish painter (died 1709)
Josefa de Óbidos, Spanish-born, Portuguese painter (died 1684)
Pietro Lucatelli, Italian painter active in Rome (died after 1690)
Stefano Erardi, Maltese painter (died 1716)
Jean Baptiste Mathey, French architect and painter (died 1696)
Francisco Meneses Osorio, Spanish painter  (died 1705)
Filippo Parodi, sculptor (died 1702)
Jan Vermeer van Utrecht, Dutch Golden Age painter (died 1696)
probable
Pietro Aquila, Italian painter and printmaker (died 1692)
Matias de Arteaga, Spanish painter and engraver (died 1704)
Orazio Bruni, Italian engraver (died unknown)
Catherine Duchemin, French flower and fruit painter (died 1698)
Cornelis Norbertus Gysbrechts, Flemish painter of still life and trompe-l'œil (died 1683)
Juan Valdelmira de Leon, Spanish of primarily still-life paintings of fruit and flowers (died 1660)
1630s: Bogdan Saltanov, Armenian-born Russian painter (died 1703)
1630/1631: Henry Gibbs, English oil painter (died 1713)

Deaths
July 13 - Matteo Zaccolini, Italian painter, priest and author (born 1574)
July 19 - Daniele Crespi, Italian painter and colorist  (born 1590)
August 5 - Antonio Tempesta, Florentine painter and engraver, worked in Rome, influenced by counter-Mannerism (born 1555)
November - Esaias van de Velde, Dutch landscape painter (born 1587)
date unknown
Marco Antonio Bassetti, Italian painter (born 1588)
Ottavio Leoni, Italian painter and printmaker (born 1578)
Alessandro Maganza, Italian Mannerist painter (born 1556)
Pasquale Ottini, Italian painter active mainly in Verona (born 1570)
Jerónimo Rodriguez de Espinosa, Spanish painter (born 1562)
victims of the Italian plague of 1629–1631
Giovanni Bernardo Carlone, Italian painter of the late-Mannerist and early-Baroque periods (born 1590)
Fede Galizia, Italian still life painter (born 1578)
probable
Giulio Cesare Angeli, Italian painter (born 1570)
Jacob Hoefnagel, Flemish naturalist and artist (born 1573)
Đorđe Mitrofanović, Serbian portraitist, icon painter and muralist (born 1550).

References

 
Years of the 17th century in art
1630s in art